Courtney Smith (born October 26, 1984) is a former Canadian football linebacker for the BC Lions and Winnipeg Blue Bombers of the Canadian Football League. He was originally signed by the BC Lions as a free agent in 2009. He played college football at Texas State–San Marcos.

External links
Just Sports Stats
Winnipeg Blue Bombers bio

1984 births
Living people
Players of American football from Georgia (U.S. state)
People from Millen, Georgia
American players of Canadian football
American football linebackers
Canadian football linebackers
Texas State Bobcats football players
Winnipeg Blue Bombers players
BC Lions players